Baron Garvagh, of Garvagh in the County Londonderry, is a title in the Peerage of Ireland. It was created in 1818 for George Canning. He had previously represented Sligo and Petersfield in Parliament and also served as Lord Lieutenant of County Londonderry. Canning was the first cousin of both Prime Minister George Canning and the diplomat Stratford Canning, 1st Viscount Stratford de Redcliffe. The title is currently held by his great-great-great-grandson, the sixth Baron, who succeeded his father in 2013.

The family seat was Garvagh House, near Garvagh, County Londonderry.

Barons Garvagh (1818–)

 George Canning, 1st Baron Garvagh (1778–1840)
 Charles Henry Spencer George Canning, 2nd Baron Garvagh (1826–1871)
 Charles John Spencer George Canning, 3rd Baron Garvagh (1852–1915)
 Leopold Ernest Stratford George Canning, 4th Baron Garvagh (1878–1956)
 (Alexander Leopold Ivor) George Canning, 5th Baron Garvagh (1920–2013)
 Spencer George Stratford de Redcliffe Canning, 6th Baron Garvagh (1953–)
(1) Hon. Stratford George Edward de Redcliffe Canning (1990–)

The heir apparent and sole heir to the peerage is the present holder's son, the Hon. Stratford George Edward de Redcliffe Canning (born 1990).

See also
Earl Canning
Viscount Stratford de Redcliffe

References

Sources

Kidd, Charles & Williamson, David (editors). Debrett's Peerage and Baronetage (1990 edition). New York: St Martin's Press, 1990, 

Baronies in the Peerage of Ireland
Noble titles created in 1818
Noble titles created for UK MPs